Bardbol (also known as Bar Dūl, Bārd-e Bal, Bardvāl, and Bardwāl) is a village in Shirvan Rural District, in the Central District of Borujerd County, Lorestan Province, Iran. At the 2006 census, its population was 29, in 7 families.

References 

Towns and villages in Borujerd County